Independence Hall replicas are buildings, models and miniatures replicating or inspired by the design of Independence Hall in Philadelphia, Pennsylvania, United States.

History
Independence Hall (1732–1753) was built as the State House for the Colony of Pennsylvania. The Second Continental Congress met there from May 1775 to December 1776, from March to September 1777, and from July 1778 to March 1781. The Declaration of Independence was debated and signed in the hall. Congress under the Articles of Confederation met there from March 1781 to June 1783. The Constitutional Convention met there from May to September 1787, where it debated, wrote, and signed the United States Constitution.

Buildings
 South San Francisco City Hall (1920), South San Francisco, California.
 Stock Yards National Bank (1925), Chicago, Illinois.
 Reading Hospital (1928), West Reading, Pennsylvania
 Baker Memorial Library (1928), Dartmouth College, Hanover, New Hampshire, Jens Fredrick Larson, architect.
 Freeport Village Hall (1928), Freeport, New York.
 Henry Ford Museum (1929), Dearborn, Michigan, Robert O. Derrick, architect.
 Liberty Motor Car Company Headquarters (1929), Detroit, Michigan, Robert O. Derrick, architect. In the 1970 and 1980s, it housed offices of Budd-ThyssenKrupp. (Demolished April 2017)
 Walter F. George School of Law (1932), Mercer University, Macon, Georgia.
 LaGuardia Hall Library (1936), Brooklyn College, Brooklyn, New York.
  Founders Library, Howard University (1937), Washington, D.C., Albert Cassell, architect. 
 Draper Hall (1938), Berea College, Berea, Kentucky.
 Miller Library (1939), Colby College, Waterville, Maine, Jens Fredrick Larson, architect.
 Bellarmine-Jefferson High School (1944), Burbank, California. Replicates the facade, inner staircase, and handrail.
 Ellen Clarke Bertrand Library (1951), Bucknell University, Lewisburg, Pennsylvania, Jens Fredrick Larson, architect.
 Queens County Savings Bank (1954), Kew Gardens Hills, New York, Harold O. Carlson, architect.
 Independence Mall (shopping center) (1964), 1601 Concord Pike (U.S. Route 202), Wilmington, Delaware.
 Knott's Berry Farm (1966), Buena Park, California. A full-size replica claimed to be the only exact replica of the original structure in the U.S. The interior scenes of Independence Hall for the 2004 movie National Treasure were filmed here.
 Benjamin Franklin Savings & Loan (1971), 10201 SE Washington Street, Portland, Oregon. Now a Bank of America branch. 
 Hall of Presidents (1971), Walt Disney World, Lake Buena Vista, Florida.  Independence Hall was also among the inspirations for the EPCOT theme park's American pavilion.
 Mahler Student Center (1992), Dallas Baptist University, Dallas, Texas.
 Harold W. Lanzer Museum (1993-2007), 12902 Ohio Route 18, east of Holgate, Ohio. In retirement, carpenter Lanzer spent 14 years building a 3/8-scale replica on his side yard.
 Founding Fathers Museum (2014), Rapid City, South Dakota.
 (proposed) Center for Law and Liberty, Houston Baptist University, Houston, Texas. HBU is currently (2015), fund-raising to build an Independence Hall replica to house its law school.

Exposition buildings
 Pennsylvania Building (1893, demolished), World's Columbian Exposition, Chicago, Illinois
 Pennsylvania Building (1907), Jamestown Exposition, Norfolk, Virginia. Now part of Naval Station Norfolk.
 Pennsylvania Pavilion (1939, demolished), New York World's Fair, Queens, New York

Models and Minatures
Under the Works Progress Administration, Pennsylvania began the Museum Extension Project, which employed artists, architects, and craftsmen to create exhibits for the state's museums. Among ae works produced were highly-detailed scale models of historic buildings. In anticipation of the September 1937 sesquicentennial of the U.S. Constitution, 2,600 painted plaster models of Independence Hall were mass-produced and shipped to schools and public buildings across the country.

 Independence Hall scale model  (1937, painted plaster, WPA), Lobby, U.S. Supreme Court Building, Washington, D.C.
 Independence Hall 1:25-scale model, Minimundus, Klagenfurt, Austria. Minimundus is a Miniature park of architectural models.
 Philly Mini Golf (2006), Franklin Square, 200 N. 6th Street, Philadelphia, Pennsylvania

Notes

References

Further reading

 
 

Independence Hall
Lists of replicas